The sphenopalatine foramen is a foramen in the skull that connects the nasal cavity with the pterygopalatine fossa.

Structure
The processes of the superior border of the palatine bone are separated by the sphenopalatine notch, which is converted into the sphenopalatine foramen by the under surface of the body of the sphenoid.

In the articulated skull this foramen leads from the pterygopalatine fossa into the posterior part of the superior meatus of the nose, and transmits the sphenopalatine artery and vein and the posterior superior lateral nasal nerve and nasopalatine nerves.

Additional images

References

External links
  (#10)
 

Foramina of the skull